The 1955–56 Purdue Boilermakers men's golf team represented Purdue University. The head coach was Sam Voinoff, then in his seventh season with the Boilermakers. The team was a member of the Big Ten Conference. They won the Big Ten Conference championship and finished in a tie for second at the NCAA championships with North Texas. The co-captains of the team were Ed McCallum and Wayne Etherton.

Roster 

Source

Schedule 
Tennessee W, 17-10
Tennessee W, 15.5-11.5
Vanderbilt W, 15.5-11.5
Illinois W, 28-8
Michigan State W, 24-12
Detroit W, 34.5-1.5
Indiana W, 27.5-8.5
Notre Dame W, 29.5-6.5
Ohio State L, 27.5-14.5
Michigan L, 21.5-14.5
Indiana W, 29.5-6.5
Michigan W, 23-19
Ohio State L, 23-13
Northwestern W, 28.5-7.5
Ohio State W, 29-7
Michigan W, 19.5-6.5
Notre Dame W, 25-11
Detroit W, 33-3
Wisconsin W, 24-12
Northwestern W, 29.5-9.5
Illinois W, 24-12
Indiana W, 29.5-9.5
Big Ten Championships 1st of 10
NCAA Championships T-2nd of 31

Big Ten Championship results

Team Results
May 25–26, 1956 in Wilmette, Illinois and Northwestern was the host school.
1. Purdue 1,501
2. Michigan 1,508
3. Ohio State 1,509
4. Wisconsin 1,520
5. Northwestern 1,526
6. Illinois 1,549
Michigan State 1,549
Minnesota 1,549
9. Iowa 1,569
10. Indiana 1,590

Individual Results
Joe Campbell won the Big Ten Conference individual title.

The top five player scores counted towards the championship.

References

Purdue Boilermakers men's golf seasons